John Fane, 11th Earl of Westmorland  (3 February 178416 October 1859), styled Lord Burghersh until 1841, was a British soldier, politician, diplomat, composer and musician.

Background
Styled Lord Burghersh from birth, he was born at Sackville Street, Piccadilly, London, the son of John Fane, 10th Earl of Westmorland, by his wife Sarah Child, daughter and heiress of the wealthy banker Sir Robert Child, builder of Osterley Park. His sister was the social hostess Sarah Villiers, Countess of Jersey, and his uncle was William Lowther, 1st Earl of Lonsdale, a Tory magnate from northern England. He was educated at Cheam School and then at Harrow from 1797 to 1799. Burghersh was admitted to Trinity College, Cambridge on 28 January 1802 and received an M.A. in 1808.

He succeeded his father in the earldom in 1841.

Military career
On 9 May 1803, Burghersh was appointed a deputy lieutenant of Northamptonshire, and after the breakdown of the Peace of Amiens, he was commissioned a lieutenant in the Northamptonshire Militia on 30 June 1803. He entered the regular army as an ensign in the 11th Foot, without purchase, on 24 December 1803. On 5 January 1804 he transferred to the 7th Foot as a lieutenant and on 3 May 1805 he transferred to the 23rd Foot as a captain. He exchanged on 1 November to the 3rd Dragoon Guards, and served as aide-de-camp to Sir George Don when the latter led reinforcements to Hanover.

As early as 1802, his uncle Lord Lonsdale had contemplated putting Burghersh into Parliament for Londsdale's pocket borough of Cockermouth when Burghersh came of age; in fact, his uncle Thomas stepped down and Burghersh was returned for the Fane constituency of Lyme Regis at the ensuing by-election on 16 March 1806. Three days later he joined Brooks's Club, traditionally a resort of Whigs and particularly Foxite, but on 30 April 1806 voted with the Pitt administration (in which his father was Lord Privy Seal) against the repeal of the Additional Forces Act. Shortly thereafter, he was sent abroad, serving as assistant adjutant general to the forces in Sicily and Egypt from 1806 to 1807. He was with Admiral Duckworth's fleet during the Dardanelles Operation and then took part in the Alexandria expedition of 1807.

Burghersh was a supporter of the second Portland Ministry, in which his father was again Lord Privy Seal, but without particular activity in Parliament, appearing once in the debate on the price of wheat on 3 June 1808. He joined the army in Portugal led by Sir Arthur Wellesley in that year, and fought at Roliça and Vimiero in August.

On 6 May 1809, he was gazetted major in the 2nd West India Regiment in place of Thomas McMahon, sent to Lord Beresford's staff in Portugal, and lieutenant colonel on 9 May when he was himself sent to Portugal, This exceedingly rapid promotion, over the heads of many senior officers, drew the attention of William Shipley, member for Flint and recently retired as a lieutenant colonel. He moved that Burghersh's promotion was in violation of Army regulations, and the resolution was carried by the House of Commons. Lord Westmorland was compelled to ask the King not to sign Burghersh's commissions, and they were accordingly cancelled. In July, Burghersh was actively engaged at the Battle of Talavera. He soon after replied to a letter of his father's on his abortive promotion in May, telling him that "the military is a profession which I most sincerely love," but expressing his frustration at not occupying a situation more equal to his education and qualities. He served with the 3rd Dragoon Guards in their campaign in Portugal in 1810.

On 16 February 1811, he purchased a majority in the 83rd Foot, then transferred to the half-pay of the 91st Foot on 21 March. On 10 December 1811 he exchanged back into the 7th Foot and later the same year purchased a lieutenant-colonelcy in the 63rd Foot. On 4 June 1814, he was appointed an extra aide-de-camp to the Prince Regent and promoted to colonel in the Army. He was an extra aide-de-camp to the Duke of Wellington (his wife's uncle) and fought at Talavera and Busaco during the Peninsular War.

On 4 June 1815, Burghersh was appointed a CB. He was promoted major general on 27 May 1825. Made a KCB on 25 February 1838, he was promoted lieutenant general on 28 June 1838 and general in 1854 and was appointed Colonel of the 56th Foot in 1842.

Political and diplomatic career
Lord Westmorland sat as a Member of Parliament (MP) for Lyme Regis between 1806 and 1816. He served as Minister to Tuscany between 1814 and 1830, as Envoy Extraordinary and Minister Plenipotentiary to Prussia between 1841 and 1851 and as Ambassador to the Austrian Empire between 1851 and 1855. In Vienna, he was one of the British representatives at the congress of 1855.

During the Revolutions of 1820 he was accused by the Austrian Government of actively supporting the Revolution in Naples, and was urged by his own Government to show more discretion. Westmorland defended his conduct by arguing that while he was "no Jacobin" and had no sympathy with the revolutionaries, he was concerned that the Austrians would put down the revolution with such brutality that further political disturbance was inevitable.

He was appointed a Companion of the Order of the Bath in 1815, a Knight Grand Cross of the Royal Guelphic Order (KCH) in 1817, a Knight Commander of the Order of the Bath (KCB) in 1838 and a Knight Grand Cross of the Order of the Bath (GCB) in 1846 and was sworn of the Privy Council in 1822.

Musician
Lord Westmorland was also a composer and a founder of the Royal Academy of Music. He was a great music lover who devoted most of his leisure hours to the study of music, was a good violinist and a prolific composer.

Family
Lord Westmorland married Priscilla Anne Pole-Wellesley, daughter of the Honourable William Wellesley-Pole, later first Baron Maryborough and third Earl of Mornington and Katherine Elizabeth Forbes, on 26 June 1811. They had seven children:
Lady Rose Sophia Mary Fane who married Henry Weigall and whose sons included the cricketer Gerry Weigall and the diplomat Archibald Weigall
Hon. John Arthur Fane (12 February 181629 August 1816)
George Augustus Frederick John Fane, Lord Burghersh (18 June 181929 April 1848)
Maria Louisa Priscilla Fane (24 May 1822 - 25 March 1837)
Ernest Fitzroy Neville Fane, Lord Burghersh (7 January 182422 June 1851)
Francis Fane, 12th Earl of Westmorland (1825–1891)
Hon. Julian Henry Charles Fane (10 October 182719 April 1870)

He died in October 1859, aged 75, and was succeeded in the earldom by his fourth but eldest surviving son, Francis. Lord Westmorland's fifth and youngest son Julian Fane was a poet and diplomat. The Countess of Westmorland died in February 1879.

See also
 Internationalization of the Danube River

References

External links
Correspondence of Lord Burghersh

Obituary in the Gentleman's Magazine

1784 births
1859 deaths
18th-century English nobility
19th-century English nobility
Diplomatic peers
People educated at Cheam School
People educated at Harrow School
Alumni of Trinity College, Cambridge
Deputy Lieutenants of Northamptonshire
British Militia officers
Devonshire Regiment officers
Royal Fusiliers officers
Royal Welch Fusiliers officers
Argyll and Sutherland Highlanders officers
63rd Regiment of Foot officers
56th Regiment of Foot officers
People of the Peninsular War
British Army generals
British Army personnel of the Napoleonic Wars
People associated with the Royal Academy of Music
Knights Grand Cross of the Order of the Bath
Knights Cross of the Military Order of Maria Theresa
Members of the Parliament of the United Kingdom for English constituencies
UK MPs 1806–1807
UK MPs 1807–1812
UK MPs 1812–1818
UK MPs who inherited peerages
Composers awarded knighthoods
John
British male composers
19th-century British composers
83rd (County of Dublin) Regiment of Foot officers
Members of the Privy Council of the United Kingdom
Earls of Westmorland
19th-century British male musicians
Barons Burghersh